Berlins history has left the city with an eclectic assortment of architecture. The city's appearance in the 21st century has been shaped by the key role the city played in Germany's 20th-century history. Each of the governments based in Berlin—the Kingdom of Prussia, the 1871 German Empire, the Weimar Republic, Nazi Germany, East Germany and the reunified Federal Republic of Germany—initiated ambitious construction programs, with each adding its distinct flavour to the city's architecture.

History

Berlin was heavily bombed during World War II, and many buildings which survived the war were demolished during the 1950s and 1960s. Much of this demolition was initiated by municipal programs for new residential, business and road construction.

Eastern Berlin has many Plattenbauten: reminders of Eastern Bloc planned residential areas, with shops and schools in a ratio fixed to the number of residents. The plain appearance of Plattenbau housing does not promote gentrification, and may be a factor that helps preserve social continuity for local residents and neighborhoods, according to architect David Chipperfield.

The ongoing construction makes Berlin very much a "work in progress," even in 2015.

East Side Gallery
The East Side Gallery is an open-air exhibition of art painted directly on the last existing portions of the Berlin Wall. It is the largest remaining evidence of the city's historical division, and was restored in 2008–2009.

Fernsehturm

Built in 1969, it can be seen from many of Berlin's central districts, and the city may be viewed from its -high observation floor. From here the Karl-Marx-Allee, lined with monumental residential buildings from the Stalin era, heads east. Adjacent to this area is the Rotes Rathaus (City Hall), with its distinctive red-brick architecture. In front of City Hall is the Neptunbrunnen, a fountain featuring a mythological group of Tritons (personifications of the four main Prussian rivers) under Neptune.

Gendarmenmarkt
The Gendarmenmarkt, a neoclassical square in Berlin named for the quarters of the 18th-century Gens d'armes regiment located in the city, is bordered by two similarly designed cathedrals: the Französischer Dom, with its observation platform, and the Deutscher Dom. The Konzerthaus (Concert Hall), home of the Berlin Symphony Orchestra, stands between the two cathedrals.

Museum Island
Museum Island, in the River Spree, houses five museums built between 1830 and 1930 and was named a UNESCO World Heritage site in 1999. Restoration and construction of a main entrance to all of the city's museums and the reconstruction of the Stadtschloss on the island has cost over two billion euros since Germany's reunification.

Adjacent to the Lustgarten and palace on the island is Berlin Cathedral, emperor William II's ambitious attempt to create a Protestant counterpart to St. Peter's Basilica in Rome. A large crypt houses the remains of some of the early Prussian royal family. The church is now owned by the Protestant umbrella Union of Evangelical Churches (UEK). Like many other buildings, it suffered extensive damage during the Second World War and required restoration. Berlin's best-preserved church, the medieval Church of St. Mary's, is the first preaching venue—Kaiser Wilhelm Memorial Church is the second—of the Bishop of the Evangelical Church of Berlin-Brandenburg-Silesian Upper Lusatia  (EKBO, a Protestant regional church body). St. Hedwig's Cathedral is Berlin's Roman Catholic cathedral.

Unter den Linden
Unter den Linden is a tree-lined east–west avenue from the Brandenburg Gate to the site of the former Berliner Stadtschloss, and was Berlin's premier promenade. Many classical buildings line the street, and part of Humboldt University is located there. Friedrichstraße was Berlin's legendary street during the Roaring Twenties, and combines 20th-century tradition with modern Berlin architecture.

Brandenburg Gate

The Brandenburg Gate is an iconic landmark of Berlin and Germany which appears on Germany's euro coins (10-cent, 20-cent and 50-cent). The Reichstag building is the traditional seat of the German Parliament, which was renovated during the 1950s after severe World War II damage. The building was again remodeled by British architect Norman Foster during the 1990s and features a glass dome over the session area, which allows free public access to parliamentary proceedings and a view of the city.

Potsdamer Platz

Potsdamer Platz is a quarter built after 1995, following the demolition of the Berlin Wall. To the west is the Kulturforum, housing the Gemäldegalerie and flanked by the Neue Nationalgalerie and the Berliner Philharmonie. The Memorial to the Murdered Jews of Europe, a Holocaust memorial, is to the north.

Hackescher Markt
The area around Hackescher Markt is a fashion and cultural base with clothing outlets, clubs, bars and galleries. It includes the Hackesche Höfe, a collection of buildings around courtyards which was rebuilt around 1996. Oranienburger Straße and the nearby New Synagogue were centers of Jewish culture before 1933. Although the New Synagogue is still an anchor for Jewish history and culture, Oranienburger straße and its surrounding area are better known for shopping and nightlife.

Straße des 17. Juni
The Straße des 17. Juni, connecting the Brandenburg Gate and Ernst-Reuter-Platz, serves as a central east–west axis. Its name commemorates the uprisings in East Berlin of 17 June 1953. About halfway from the Brandenburg Gate is the Großer Stern, a circular traffic island on which the Siegessäule (Victory Column) is situated. This monument, built to commemorate Prussia's victories, was relocated in 1938–1939 from its previous position in front of the Reichstag.

Kurfürstendamm
The Kurfürstendamm is home to some of Berlin's luxurious stores, with the Kaiser Wilhelm Memorial Church at its eastern end on Breitscheidplatz. The church was destroyed during World War II, and left in ruins. Nearby on Tauentzienstraße is KaDeWe, continental Europe's largest department store. The Rathaus Schöneberg, where John F. Kennedy made his "Ich bin ein Berliner!" speech, is located in Tempelhof-Schöneberg.

Schloss Bellevue

West of the city centre, Schloss Bellevue is the residence of the German president. Schloss Charlottenburg was largely destroyed by fire during World War II, and was rebuilt as the largest surviving historical palace in Berlin.

Funkturm Berlin
The Funkturm Berlin is a -tall lattice radio tower built between 1924 and 1926.

Landmarks

References

Buildings and structures in Berlin
Culture in Berlin
Berlin